First Presbyterian Church is a historic church at 200 E. Clinton Street in Jacksonville, Alabama.  It was built in 1859 and added to the National Register in 1982.

References

External links
Historic American Buildings Survey, Presbyterian Church, North Chinabee & East Clinton Streets, Jacksonville, Calhoun County, AL

Presbyterian churches in Alabama
Churches on the National Register of Historic Places in Alabama
National Register of Historic Places in Calhoun County, Alabama
Romanesque Revival church buildings in Alabama
Churches completed in 1859
Churches in Calhoun County, Alabama